Red Hill is a historic plantation house located near Bullock, Granville County, North Carolina.  The house consists of three parts: a -story, two-bay gambrel-roofed Georgian style center block built about 1776; a -story, two-bay one-room, gable-roofed Georgian style block with transitional Federal features, built about 1807; and a very tall two-story, three-bay, transitional Federal/ Greek Revival style addition, built about 1820, style frame I-house dwelling.  It has a full basement, full width front porch, and exterior brick chimneys.  Across from the house is the -story heavy timber frame tobacco manufactory.  Also on the property are the contributing wash house / striphouse, open wellhouse, smokehouse, privy, and flower house / chicken house.

It was listed on the National Register of Historic Places in 1986.

References

Plantation houses in North Carolina
Houses on the National Register of Historic Places in North Carolina
Georgian architecture in North Carolina
Federal architecture in North Carolina
Greek Revival houses in North Carolina
Houses completed in 1776
Houses in Granville County, North Carolina
National Register of Historic Places in Granville County, North Carolina